San Leobardo Méndez (born 21 September 1994) is a Belizean international footballer who plays for Verdes FC, as a defender.

Career
He has played club football for Verdes FC.

He made his international debut for Belize in 2013.

References

1994 births
Living people
Belizean footballers
Belize international footballers
Verdes FC players
Association football defenders